John Jacob Desmond (April 5, 1922 Denver, Colorado - March 27, 2008 Zachary, Louisiana) was an architect from Hammond and Baton Rouge, Louisiana.

Early life
John Desmond was the third child of Timothy Joseph Desmond (Cork City, Ireland) and Rose Isabelle Dvorak Desmond. After living for some time in New York, the family moved to New Orleans, Louisiana, where Desmond graduated from Jesuit High School. After moving with his family to Hammond, Louisiana, he became a recipient of a legislative scholarship for his first year at Tulane University. By working in the cafeteria he was able to complete a bachelor's degree in architecture. He subsequently received a master's of Architecture from the Massachusetts Institute of Technology where he studied under William Wurster and Alvar Aalto. He was a Second Lieutenant in the United States Navy during World War II aboard the destroyer U.S.S. Madison  in the Pacific theater and also saw action at the Battle of Anzio.

Career
After returning from WWII but before practicing architecture in Hammond, Desmond worked for Skidmore Owings & Merrill, in New York City; A. Hays Town in Baton Rouge; and the Tennessee Valley Authority, in Knoxville. 

Some of the buildings he designed include the Southeastern Louisiana University cafeteria in Hammond, LSU Union, the Louisiana State Library, the Cane's River Center (originally named the Riverside Centroplex and later the Baton Rouge River Center), the Pennington Bio-Medical Research Center, the Fifth Circuit Court of Appeals, the Louisiana State Archives, the Louisiana Naval Museum, St. Joseph's Cathedral as well as his own residence, all in Baton Rouge. In New Orleans, he designed the Rogers Memorial Chapel, as well as the Lindy Boggs Center, both on the Campus of his alma mater, Tulane University.

References

1922 births
2008 deaths
Tulane School of Architecture alumni
MIT School of Architecture and Planning alumni
Architects from Denver
Architects from New Orleans
United States Navy officers
United States Navy personnel of World War II